Ciudad Deportiva Atlético de Madrid, officially Ciudad Wanda Deportiva Atlético de Madrid is the training ground and academy base of Spanish football club Atlético Madrid. It was officially opened on 13 September 1995.

Located in Majadahonda and covering 55,000 m² it is used since 1995 for youth and senior team trainings. It is also home to the mini Estadio Cerro del Espino, which is the home ground of Atlético Madrid B and CF Rayo Majadahonda, both playing in Segunda División B.

Facilities
 Estadio Cerro del Espino with a capacity of 3,800 seats, is the home stadium of Atlético Madrid B, the reserve team of Atlético Madrid, and Rayo Majadahonda.
 2 grass pitches.
 2 FieldTurf artificial pitches.
 A Service building with catering and other facilities.
 A Gymnasium.

Future sports city
The club's future training facilities will be built in the city of Alcorcón which is located 15 km southwest of the Madrid metropolitan area. According to the preliminary design of the new sports city, the training centre will accommodate 11 regular-sized training pitches, a stadium with a capacity of 15,000 seats, a medical centre, a dressing room building and a residential building for the players. With an area of 1.4 million m², the new complex will cost about 114 million euros. The training complex will be surrounded with a sports club including a golf course, multiple tennis courts and swimming pools. The complex will accommodate a hotel and a shopping centre as well.

References

Atlético Madrid
Atlético de Madrid
Sports venues in the Community of Madrid
Sports venues completed in 1995